Heart ‘n’ Soul is the fifth album by English singer Tina Charles, who achieved success as a disco artist in the mid to late 1970s. It reached No. 35 in the UK Albums Chart.

Track listing
Side 1
"Love Bug/Sweets for My Sweet" (Biddu, Gerry Shury, Roker/Doc Pomus, Mort Shuman) 6:56 
"I'll Go Where Your Music Takes Me" (Biddu) 4:46 
"Stop What You're Doing to Me” (Biddu) 3:08
"Rendezvous" (Jack Robinson, James Bolden) 3:22

Side 2
"Fallin’ in Love in Summertime" (Jack Robinson, James Bolden) 3:17 
"I Gotta Dance with You" (Chris Rae, Frank McDonald) 3:21
"I’ll Be Your Light (In Your Moment of Darkness)" (Biddu) 4:20
"Ain’t Gonna Hide my Love" (Bobby Skelton) 3:48
"Go" (Biddu) 3:30

Musicians
Tina Charles - lead and backing vocals
Chris Rae
Gerry Shury
Frank McDonald
Barry De Souza
Pip Williams
Chris Karan
Frank Ricotti
Julian Gaillard - strings and brass
Richard Dodd
Bones, Biddu – backing vocals

Production
All tracks arranged by Gerry Shury and Biddu, except "Fallin' in Love in Summertine" and "Go" arranged by Pip Williams and Biddu
Recording engineer – Richard Dodd
Tape men – Howard Cross, Mark Chapman, Tim Painter and Steve Parker.
Album sleeve design – Simon Cantwell, Les May and Roslav Szaybo (CBS Records)
Cover Photo Brian Cooke (front cover) and Peter Lavery (back cover)

Charts

Certifications and sales

References

Tina Charles (singer) albums
1977 albums
Albums produced by Biddu
CBS Records albums